Joseph L. Sanders (October 26, 1896, Thayer, Kansas - May 14, 1965, Kansas City, Missouri) was an American jazz pianist, singer, and band leader associated with Kansas City jazz for most of his career.

Sanders was best known for co-leading the Coon-Sanders' Nighthawks along with Carleton Coon (1894–1932). The pair formed the group in 1920 in Kansas City under the name Coon-Sanders Novelty Orchestra, broadcast for the first time on radio the following year, and became known as the Nighthawks because of their frequent appearances on late night radio. They recorded in Chicago in 1924 and held a residency at the Blackhawk club in that city from 1926. The ensemble toured as a Midwestern territory band, and after Coon's death Sanders continued to lead the band under his own name.

Sanders worked mostly in Hollywood studios in the 1940s, and occasionally led performances at the Blackhawk once again. He was a vocalist for the Kansas City Opera in the 1950s.

Sanders' brother, Roy Sanders (National League pitcher), was a professional baseball player.

References
Eugene Chadbourne, [ Joe Sanders] at Allmusic
"Joe Sanders". The New Grove Dictionary of Jazz.

Further reading
John Chilton, Who's Who of Jazz.
Colton/Kunstadt, "Encore: The Story of Coon-Sanders". Record Research 13 (1957), p. 3
D.A. Johnson, "The Happy-go-lucky Sounds of Coon-Sanders Nighthawks". Mississippi Rag i/3 (1974), p. 7.

External links
 Joe Sanders recordings at the Discography of American Historical Recordings.

1896 births
1965 deaths
American jazz bandleaders
American jazz pianists
American male pianists
Musicians from Kansas
People from Neosho County, Kansas
20th-century American conductors (music)
20th-century American pianists
20th-century American male musicians
American male jazz musicians
Criss Cross Jazz artists